
This is a list of players who graduated from the Nationwide Tour in 2006. The top 22 players on the Nationwide Tour's money list in 2006 earned their PGA Tour card for 2007.

*PGA Tour rookie for 2007.
†First-time PGA Tour member, but not a rookie due to having accepted Special Temporary Membership and played 22 tournaments during the 2002 PGA Tour season
T = Tied
Green background indicates the player retained his PGA Tour card for 2008 (won or finished inside the top 125).
Yellow background indicates the player did not retain his PGA Tour card for 2008, but retained conditional status (finished between 126–150).
Red background indicates the player did not retain his PGA Tour card for 2008 (finished outside the top 150).

Winners on the PGA Tour in 2007

Runners-up on the PGA Tour in 2007

See also
2006 PGA Tour Qualifying School graduates

References
All information from here, individual player profiles and golfstats.com.

External links
2006 Nationwide Tour graduate list on the PGA Tour's official site
Money list
Player profiles

Korn Ferry Tour
PGA Tour
Nationwide Tour Graduates
Nationwide Tour Graduates